The 2001 Country Music Association Awards, 35th Ceremony, was held on November 7, 2001 at the Grand Ole Opry House, Nashville, Tennessee, and was hosted by CMA Award Winner, Vince Gill.

Sara Evans lead the night with 5 nominations, including Female Vocalist of the Year, and Album of the Year.

Winners and nominees

References 

Country Music Association
CMA
Country Music Association Awards
Country Music Association Awards
Country Music Association Awards
Country Music Association Awards
21st century in Nashville, Tennessee
Events in Nashville, Tennessee